Madrasa Saheb Ettabaâ is one of the madrasahs of the medina of Tunis.

Localization 
It is located in Sidi El Aloui Street, near Saheb Ettabaâ Mosque in El Halfaouine square.

History
The madrasa was built with the Saheb Ettabaâ Mosque during the Husainid era following the orders of Youssef Saheb Ettabaa. 

In 1930, it accommodated 71 students.

After the independence, a part of the madrasa became the office of a Neo Destour club.

Description
It is divided into two parts: The main one is called Madrasa Saheb Ettabaâ Al Kubra (big madrasa) while the other one is named Madrasa Saheb Ettabaâ Al Sughra (small madrasa).

Teachers
Sidi Brahim Riahi was one of the most popular professors to teach in this madrasa like Mohamed Laroussi Metoui.

The last director of the madrasa was Omar Chachia.

References 

	

Saheb Ettabaâ